The Ikey Tigers are a South African rugby union team from the University of Cape Town in the Western Cape who compete in the FNB Varsity Cup.

History

The "Ikey" nickname originated in the 1910s as an anti-semitic epithet applied to UCT students by the students of Stellenbosch University, because of the supposed large number of Jewish students at UCT.

Since the inception of the FNB Varsity Cup, the Ikey Tigers have been one of the strongest competitors, finishing runners up in 2008 and 2010. Both final loses fell at the hands of the Ikeys arch rival, the Maties. In 2008 UCT went down to Maties by 16–10 in the inaugural Varsity Cup final after topping the log at the end of the round robin stage of the competition. In 2009, UCT were once again prominent in the round robin stage, finishing second and qualifying for a second home semi-final. They lost the game to the NWU Pukke by 17–19.

The 2010 Varsity Cup saw another strong showing from UCT as they once again finished second on the log. They qualified for their second final by beating the Shimlas of Free State at home by 27–21. They then went on to play Maties in the final with the game resulting in the closest winning margin in the history of the competition with Maties winning by 17–14.

In 2011 UCT finished second on the log for a third successive time and claimed an unprecedented 4th Semi-Final appearance. They once again faced Shimlas in their home semi-final, beating them by 57–20 to qualify for their third final. The 2011 final took place on 11 April in Pretoria featuring UCT against Tuks. UCT won by 26–16 to claim their first ever Varsity Cup title.

Stadium

The Ikey Tigers play their home fixtures on the Groote Schuur Rugby Field which is adjacent to the university campus. The fields are known commonly by UCT students as The Green Mile. Since the inception of the Varsity Cup, the field has not met the required standards for night fixtures which has resulted in UCT playing two "home" finals away, namely in 2008 when they had to travel to Stellenbosch to play Maties and in 2011 when they had to travel to Pretoria to play Tuks. On 7 March 2011 the UCT rugby club received a $1 million donation from Neville Isdell which allowed them to dust off their longtime plans to build a proper rugby stadium.

Rivalries

The Ikey Tigers main rivalry is with Stellenbosch University's Maties. The rivalry is fuelled by the relative geographical proximity of the two universities, and their status as the two top universities in the Western Cape. This rivalry is further intensified by the fact that they are the two most successful teams in the competition and have competed two finals against each other. Matches between these two teams draw large crowds and are normally televised on SuperSport.

Results:

Current squad

The squad for the 2016 Varsity Cup was named as follows:

Season standings

Individual records
 Tries (Season): Mathew Turner (9 tries in 2008); Therlow Pietersen (7 tries in 2011); Therlow Pietersen (6 tries in 2009)
 Tries (Career): Therlow Pietersen (15); Marcello Sampson (14); Mathew Turner (9)
 Most Points (Season): Demetri Catrakilis (136 in 2011)
 Most Points (Career): Matthew Rosslee

Player awards
 2008 Top Try Scorer - Mathew Turner (9 tries)
 2009 Top Try Scorer - Therlow Pietersen (6 tries)
 2009 Back That Rocks - Therlow Pietersen
 2011 Top Try Scorer - Therlow Pietersen (7 tries)
 2011 Top Points Scorer - Demetri Catrakilis (136 points)
 2014 Forward That Rocks - Shaun McDonald

Notable players and coaches
 Jake White - Assistant Coach 2008
 Bobby Skinstad - Assistant Coach 2008
 Robbie Fleck - Assistant Coach 2009
 Mathew Turner - Wing 2008
 Tim Whitehead - Center 2008
 Kyle Brown - Wing 2008
 JJ Gagiano - 8th Man 2008–2010
 Siya Kolisi - Flank 2010
 Marcel Brache - Wing 2010-2011
 Nic Groom - Scrumhalf 2010-2011
 Demetri Catrakilis - Fly Half 2011
 Nizaam Carr - Flank 2011
 Eben Etzebeth - Lock 2011
Don Armand - Lock, flank 2008-2011
Damian de Allende - Centre 2012
Oli Kebble - Prop 2013
Huw Jones - Centre 2014

See also
 FNB Varsity Cup
 2011 Varsity Cup
 University of Cape Town
 FNB

References

External links
http://www.uctrfc.co.za
http://www.uct.ac.za
http://www.varsitycup.co.za

South African rugby union teams
University of Cape Town
University and college rugby union clubs in South Africa